Toyota Motor Manufacturing Turkey (TMMT) is one of Toyota's vehicle production bases in Europe. It is located in Adapazarı, Sakarya, Turkey, and has been manufacturing the Corolla (since 1994), the Corolla Verso, the Verso (2009–2018), the Auris (2007–2012), and the Toyota C-HR (2016–present). A majority of the production is exported to over 30 countries, most of which are in Europe.

Today, with an annual production capacity of 280,000 units, Toyota Motor Manufacturing Turkey (TMMT) is one of Toyota's biggest plants in Europe operations, and one of Turkey's biggest manufacturing companies.

Current production
Corolla (1994–present)
C-HR (2016–present)

Former production
Auris (2007–2012)
Verso (2009–2018)

References

External links
 

Car manufacturers of Turkey
Vehicle manufacturing companies established in 1990
Toyota factories